Sulmash is a rural locality (a selo) and the administrative center of Sulmashinskoye Rural Settlement, Chernushinsky District, Perm Krai, Russia. The population was 673 as of 2010. There are 28 streets.

Geography 
Sulmash is located 5 km north of Chernushka (the district's administrative centre) by road. Azinsky is the nearest rural locality.

References 

Rural localities in Chernushinsky District